Medo may refer to:

Medo Township, Blue Earth County, Minnesota
Medo, West Virginia
Middle East Defence Organisation

People with the name Medo
Mohamed Kamara, nicknamed Medo
Medo Martinello
Medo Pucić